Alpnachstad railway station is a Swiss railway station in the municipality of Alpnach in the canton of Obwalden. It is on the Brünig line, owned by the Zentralbahn, that links Lucerne and Interlaken. Alpnachstad PB railway station, the lower terminus of the Pilatus Railway, a rack railway that ascends to the summit of Pilatus, is located across the street.

Services 
The following services stop at Alpnachstad:

A nearby quay on Lake Lucerne is served by shipping services of the Schifffahrtsgesellschaft des Vierwaldstättersees (SGV), providing an alternative connection to Lucerne and other lakeside communities.

References

External links 
 
 

Railway stations in the canton of Obwalden
Alpnach
Zentralbahn stations